Prince Johann of Schleswig-Holstein-Sonderburg-Glücksburg (5 December 1825 – 27 May 1911) was the ninth of the ten children of Friedrich Wilhelm, Duke of Schleswig-Holstein-Sonderburg-Glücksburg and Princess Louise Caroline of Hesse-Kassel. He was named after his ancestor John II, Duke of Schleswig-Holstein-Sonderburg.

Biography
As per the wishes of his cousin King Christian VIII, Prince Johann first enlisted in the Prussian military in 1842 and upon his graduation was appointed Second Lieutenant of the 27th Prussian Infantry Regiment in Magdeburg. He studied at the University of Bonn before joining the Dragoon Guards Regiments in Berlin. He participated in the German revolutions of 1848–1849 and the First Schleswig War against Denmark; this conflict of loyalties between Prussia and Denmark prompted him to request exemption from service. He went on to serve in various departments and was promoted to Rittmeister in 1854. The following year he was appointed Major à la suite and went to Denmark, settling down in Copenhagen.

When the Second Schleswig War broke out in 1864, Johann resigned from the Prussian army, and on 29 February his brother — now King Christian IX of Denmark — appointed him Lieutenant Colonel à la suite in the Danish Army. He went on to represent Denmark on diplomatic visits abroad, and was present in London during the baptism of the Prince of Wales' son, the future George V of the United Kingdom. He was promoted to Colonel in 1865, and further to Major-general in 1867.

From March to November 1867 he served as regent for his nephew, King George I of Greece during the Cretan uprising, when the latter was away on a tour of Europe in search of a bride; he soon grew popular among the people.

Johann died unmarried in 1911, outliving the rest of his siblings. He was interred at Roskilde Cathedral.

Honours

Ancestry

References

Citations

Bibliography

External links 

1825 births
1911 deaths
19th-century regents of Greece
People from Schleswig, Schleswig-Holstein
Princes of Schleswig-Holstein-Sonderburg-Glücksburg
University of Bonn alumni
People of the First Schleswig War
Danish Freemasons
Regents of Greece
Burials at Roskilde Cathedral
Recipients of the Cross of Honour of the Order of the Dannebrog
Grand Crosses of the Order of the Dannebrog
Knights of the Order of Charles XIII
Recipients of the Order of St. Anna, 1st class
Recipients of the Order of the White Eagle (Russia)
Honorary Knights Grand Cross of the Royal Victorian Order
Grand Croix of the Légion d'honneur